is a former Japanese football player and manager.

Playing career
Hayano was born in Kanagawa Prefecture on November 14, 1955. After graduating from Chuo University, he played for Nissan Motors from 1978 to 1986.

Coaching career
After retirement, Hayano started coaching career at Nissan Motors (later Yokohama F. Marinos). He managed youth team and Nissan FC Ladies until 1991. In 1992, he became assistant coach for top team. In June 1995, he was promoted to manager to replace Jorge Solari for health reasons. He led the club to won the champions. He managed until 1996. After that, he managed Gamba Osaka (1999-2001), Kashiwa Reysol (2004-2005) and Yokohama F. Marinos (2006).

Managerial statistics

References

External links

1955 births
Living people
Chuo University alumni
Association football people from Kanagawa Prefecture
Japanese footballers
Japan Soccer League players
Yokohama F. Marinos players
Japanese football managers
J1 League managers
Yokohama F. Marinos managers
Gamba Osaka managers
Kashiwa Reysol managers
Association football forwards